Alan Williams (born March 1965) is an American composer and orchestrator for movie soundtracks and television series.
He grew up in Fort Collins, Colorado, USA.

External links

Official site, "Silverscreen Music"
Biography on MusicUK
IMAX-Artist page on IMC Online

1965 births
Living people
People from Fort Collins, Colorado
American male composers
Animation composers
21st-century American composers
21st-century American male musicians